This is a list of the fellows of the Royal Society elected in 1912. Note there were no foreign members elected this year.

John Oliver Arnold
Charles Glover Barkla
Leonard Cockayne
Arthur Lee Dixon
Sir Thomas Little Heath
Humphrey Owen Jones
Sir Thomas Ranken Lyle
William McDougall
Rudolf Messel
Benjamin Moore
Edward Nettleship
Robert Newstead
Sir Henry John Oram
George Thurland Prior
Reginald Crundall Punnett

1912
1912 in the United Kingdom
1912 in science